Meet Me in Margaritaville: The Ultimate Collection is a Jimmy Buffett greatest hits compilation album consisting of 2 compact discs and 38 songs. The album is notable for several newly recorded and updated versions of songs considered as classics in his repertoire.  It includes every track from Songs You Know By Heart except for "Boat Drinks".

This collection presents 12 new recordings.  As this is a career retrospective and aimed at a more casual audience, the album met criticism due to a quarter of the material being new recordings rather than focus on the original incarnations of the songs.

The following six songs are re-recordings of previously released songs: "The Captain and the Kid", "He Went to Paris", "In the Shelter", "Knees of My Heart", "Saxophones", and "Son of a Son of a Sailor".  The new version of "Son of a Son of a Sailor" is a duet with  Nadirah Shakoor. The following four songs are new live recordings: "Desperation Samba (Halloween in Tijuana)", "Holiday", "The Pascagoula Run" and "A Pirate Looks at Forty". Buffett also newly recorded two covers: ""Everybody's Talkin'" by Fred Neil (but made famous in a recording by Harry Nilsson) and The Beach Boys' "Sail On Sailor".  Despite being included as the original studio version, "Volcano"'s fourth verse has been rewritten and overdubbed.

Track listing
All songs written by Jimmy Buffett unless otherwise noted.

Disc one
 "Margaritaville" – 4:10
 "Migration" – 4:14
 "Growing Older but Not Up" – 3:26
 "Holiday" (Buffett/Eaton/MacDonald/Salter) – 5:24 (Recorded live on 2/10/2001 in Sunrise, FL)
 "Come Monday" – 3:09
 "Fruitcakes" (Buffett/Lee) – 7:39
 "We Are the People Our Parents Warned Us About" – 3:21
 "Cheeseburger in Paradise" – 2:50
 "Jolly Mon Sing" (Buffett/Jennings/Utley) – 3:15
 "The Pascagoula Run" (Buffett/Oliver) – 4:00 (Recorded live on 2/5/2003 in Columbia, SC)
 "Tin Cup Chalice" – 3:37
 "Pencil Thin Moustache" – 2:51
 "Grapefruit/Juicy Fruit" – 2:57
 "Coconut Telegraph" – 2:59
 "Changes in Latitudes, Changes in Attitudes" – 3:17
 "Last Mango in Paris" (Buffett/Chapman/Jennings/Utley) – 3:16
 "Fins" (Buffett/Chance/Corcoran/McColl) – 3:26
 "Why Don't We Get Drunk" (Gardens) – 2:43
 "Brown Eyed Girl" (Morrison) – 3:54
 "One Particular Harbour" (Buffett/Holcomb) – 5:30

Disc two
 "School Boy Heart" (Betton/Buffett) – 4:33
 "Everybody's Talkin'" (Neil) – 3:00
 "Volcano" (Buffett/Daily/Sykes) – 3:38  (Overdubbed Fourth Verse)
 "Son of a Son of a Sailor" – 4:46  (Exclusive Re-Recording)
 "Take Another Road" (Buffett/Guth/Oliver) – 3:41
 "Knees of My Heart" (Buffett/Jennings/Utley) – 3:03  (Exclusive Re-Recording)
 "In the Shelter" – 4:01  (Exclusive Re-Recording)
 "Havana Daydreamin'" – 3:39
 "Desperation Samba (Halloween in Tijuana)" (Buffett/Jennings/Schmit) – 4:17 (Recorded live on 9/29/2001 in Tinley Park, IL)
 "Barefoot Children" (Buffett/Guth/Kunkel/Mayer/Oliver) – 4:53
 "Saxophones" – 3:48  (Exclusive Re-Recording)
 "Cowboy in the Jungle" – 5:08
 "He Went to Paris" – 3:56  (Exclusive Re-Recording)
 "Creola" (Buffett/McDonald/Salter) – 7:01
 "Bob Robert's Society Band" (Buffett/Lee) – 3:43
 "A Pirate Looks at Forty" – 4:33 (Recorded live on 8/20/2002 in Burgettstown, PA)
 "Sail On, Sailor" (Almer/Kennedy/Parks/Rieley/Wilson) – 2:44
 "The Captain and the Kid" – 3:24  (Exclusive Re-Recording)

References

2003 greatest hits albums
Jimmy Buffett compilation albums
Mailboat Records compilation albums
MCA Records compilation albums